WONDER MOMO-i〜New recording〜 is the third CD single by Haruko Momoi. The album is inspired by and utilizes the themes from the video game Wonder Momo, and the title itself is a pun from Haruko's own surname "Momoi." Haruko herself cosplays the main character, Momo, for the album cover as well as during concert performances. The title track is also featured as a playable song in the PS2 game Taiko no Tatsujin: Tobikkiri! ANIME SPECIAL.

Track listing
"WONDER MOMO-i〜New recording〜"
"ONCE UPON A TIME〜Fairy story〜"
"WONDER MOMO-i〜New recording〜 (original karaoke)"
"ONCE UPON A TIME〜Fairy story〜 (original karaoke)"

References

Haruko Momoi songs